Skogskyrkogården metro station is on the green line of the Stockholm metro, located in Gamla Enskede, Söderort, very close to the cemetery Skogskyrkogården (the Woodland Cemetery). The station was opened on 1 October 1950 as part of the inaugural stretch of Stockholm metro between Slussen and Hökarängen.

References

Green line (Stockholm metro) stations
Railway stations opened in 1950
1950 establishments in Sweden